Greatest Hits is a 2005 compilation album by the American punk rock band The Offspring, compiling hit singles from five of their seven (at the time) studio albums along with the previously unreleased songs "Can't Repeat" and "Next to You", the latter a cover version of The Police song included as a hidden track at the end of the album. Greatest Hits peaked at no. 8 on the Billboard 200, with 70,000 copies sold in its first week of release, and has been certified Platinum by the Recording Industry Association of America.

"Can't Repeat" was released as a single to promote the album, and peaked at no. 9 on Billboard's Modern Rock Tracks chart and no. 10 on its Mainstream Rock Tracks. "Next to You" was also released as a single to radio stations, peaking at no. 29 on Mainstream Rock Tracks. A DVD/UMD video entitled Complete Music Video Collection was released a month later to complement Greatest Hits. It included the music videos for all fourteen songs on Greatest Hits (excluding "Next to You", for which no video was filmed), as well as three additional songs which had been released as singles but were not included on Greatest Hits: "The Meaning of Life" and "I Choose" from Ixnay on the Hombre, and "She's Got Issues" from Americana. These songs, along with several others the band had released as singles during the course of their career, had not charted as highly as those selected for Greatest Hits.

Multiple drummers
The album's two new tracks, "Can't Repeat" and "Next to You", were recorded during the period in which Atom Willard was the band's official drummer. Original drummer Ron Welty had left the group in early 2003, and The Vandals drummer Josh Freese recorded the drum tracks for the band's 2003 album Splinter after his departure. Willard joined shortly after the album's release and appeared with them in the music video for the single "(Can't Get My) Head Around You". Willard appeared with the band in the "Can't Repeat" music video. In late 2005 Willard officially announced that he was leaving The Offspring to focus on Angels & Airwaves. Freese again recorded drum tracks for The Offspring for their 2008 album Rise and Fall, Rage and Grace before it was announced that Willard's permanent replacement would be former Face to Face drummer Pete Parada.

Track listing

International bonus tracks
On each edition, "Next to You" appears as a hidden track on track 15.

DualDisc edition
The DualDisc edition of the album has the standard 14 track album on the CD side. The DVD side has the same 14 tracks in 5.1 surround sound, commentary by singer Dexter Holland and guitarist Noodles, and the two performing an acoustic rendition of the song "Dirty Magic" from the band's second album Ignition.

Vinyl edition
The vinyl edition of the album was released July 29, 2022. It came in three formats: a black LP with lyric insert, a limited-edition picture disc featuring the band’s flaming skull logo and a limited-edition version with a slipmat also featuring the flaming skull logo. Prior to that, on Record Store Day 2022, Greatest Hits was released on vinyl in a limited run of 7,000 copies on either translucent or solid blue. All vinyl versions feature the standard 14 track album.

Charts

Weekly charts

Year-end charts

Certifications

Personnel
The Offspring
Dexter Holland – lead vocals, guitar
Greg K. – bass guitar
Noodles – lead guitar
Ron Welty – drums on tracks 2–12, and on track 15 of the European and South American editions.
Atom Willard – drums on "Next to You"

Additional musicians
Josh Freese – drums on tracks 1, 13, and 14, as well as on track 15 of the Australian and Japanese editions.
Ronnie King – keyboards on "Hit That"
Gabe McNair and Phil Jordan – horns on "Why Don't You Get a Job?"
Derrick Davis – flute on "Why Don't You Get a Job?"

Additional vocalists
Jason "Blackball" McLean – additional vocals on "Come Out and Play (Keep 'Em Separated)"
Chris Higgins, Heidi Villagran, and Nika Futterman Frost – additional vocals on "Pretty Fly (For a White Guy)"
Jack Grisham, Davey Havok, and Jim Lindberg – backing vocals on "Pretty Fly (For a White Guy)"
Redman – additional vocals on "Original Prankster"

Production
Jerry Finn – producer and mixer of "Can't Repeat" and "Next To You"
Joe McGrath – recording engineer of "Can't Repeat", assisted by Seth Waldman
Thom Wilson – producer and engineer of tracks 2–4, with additional engineering by Ken Paulakovich
Dave Jerden – producer and mix engineer of tracks 5–9
Bryan Carlstrom – engineer of tracks 5–9
Brendan O'Brien – producer and mix engineer of tracks 10–14
Nick DiDia – engineer of tracks 10 and 11, recording of tracks 12 and 13
Billy Bowers – additional engineering on tracks 10–14
Chris Higgins – additional recording on tracks 10 and 12
Karl Egsieker – recording (with DiDia) of "Hit That", recording of "(Can't Get My) Head Around You"
Eddy Schreyer – mastering of all tracks except 1 and 13
Brian Gardner – mastering of tracks 1 and 13

References

Notes

External links
Album description at the band's official Web site

2005 greatest hits albums
The Offspring compilation albums
Albums produced by Brendan O'Brien (record producer)
Albums produced by Jerry Finn
Albums produced by Thom Wilson
Columbia Records compilation albums